The West End Transitway is a proposed  bus rapid transit line between Van Dorn and Pentagon Washington Metro stations. It would serve the City of Alexandria, Virginia, as well as Arlington County, Virginia.

Route 

The bus line would primarily run through the West End neighborhood of Alexandria, before making connections both in the urban village of Shirlington, as well as at the Pentagon. The preferred alignment would also connect to Northern Virginia Community College.

The proposed bus line would have both mixed use and dedicated lanes. It would have high-quality bus stations with rider amenities.

Planning 

In the Fall of 2016, Alternatives Analysis was done and Environmental Documentation was generated for the project.

The project received $57.2 million in state funding in July 2019. This will allow for street upgrades like sidewalks and bicycle facilities. It will also be put towards the purchase of buses.

References 

Proposed bus rapid transit in the United States
Proposed public transportation in Virginia
Bus rapid transit in Virginia